Matthew Robert Smith (born 28 October 1982) is an English actor. He is best known for his roles as the eleventh incarnation of the Doctor in the BBC series Doctor Who (2010–2014), Daemon Targaryen in the HBO series House of the Dragon (2022–present) and Prince Philip in the Netflix series The Crown (2016–2017), the lattermost of which earned him a Primetime Emmy Award nomination.

Smith initially aspired to be a professional footballer, but spondylolysis forced him out of the sport. After joining the National Youth Theatre and studying drama and creative writing at the University of East Anglia, he became an actor in 2003, performing in plays including Murder in the Cathedral, Fresh Kills, The History Boys and On the Shore of the Wide World in London theatres. Extending his repertoire into West End theatre, he has since performed in the stage adaptation of Swimming with Sharks with Christian Slater, followed a year later by a critically acclaimed performance as Henry in That Face.

Smith's first television role came in 2006 as Jim Taylor in the BBC adaptations of Philip Pullman's The Ruby in the Smoke and The Shadow in the North, while his first major role in television came as Danny in the 2007 BBC series Party Animals. Smith portrayed the eleventh incarnation of the Doctor in Doctor Who from 2010 to 2013, becoming the youngest person to portray the character. In film, he portrayed a dual role in Womb (2010), the physical forms of Skynet in Terminator Genisys (2015), 1960s pimp Jack in Last Night in Soho (2021), and Milo in Morbius (2022).

Early life
Matthew Robert Smith was born in Northampton, Northamptonshire on 28 October 1982, the son of Lynne and David Smith. He has an elder sister named Laura Jayne, who was one of the dancers featured in the well-known music video for Eric Prydz's 2004 song "Call on Me". Smith attended Northampton School for Boys. His grandfather had played football for Notts County and Smith had also planned to play football, having played for the youth teams of Northampton Town, Nottingham Forest, and Leicester City, becoming captain of the latter's youth team. A serious back injury resulted in spondylolysis, and he was unable to continue with a footballing career.

Smith's drama teacher introduced him to acting by signing him up for theatrical productions without his consent. After failing to participate on the first two occasions, his teacher arranged for him to play the tenth juror in an adaptation of Twelve Angry Men. Although he took part, he refused to attend a drama festival for which his teacher had also signed him up, as he saw himself as a football player and believed acting would damage his social life. His teacher persisted, eventually persuading him to join the National Youth Theatre in London. After leaving school, Smith studied Drama and Creative Writing at the University of East Anglia, graduating in 2005. With the National Youth Theatre, he played Thomas Becket in Murder in the Cathedral and Bassoon in The Master and Margarita. His role in the latter earned him an agent and his first professional jobs, Fresh Kills and On the Shore of the Wide World, which led him to seek an agreement with his university so that he could graduate without attending lectures in his final year.

Career

Television

Early work
Smith's first television role was as Jim Taylor in the BBC adaptations of the Sally Lockhart quartet books The Ruby in the Smoke and The Shadow in the North. His first major television role came in the television series Party Animals, a BBC drama series about fictional parliamentary advisors and researchers. Smith portrayed Danny Foster, a parliamentary researcher who was described as an intelligent but timid "politics geek" who should have moved on from researching at his age. In an interview in 2007, Smith summarised the character as having a romantic outlook of the political world while being cynical elsewhere. He talked about his character's emotional and intellectual maturity; emotionally, he lacks confidence around women, though Smith portrays him as a caring and sensitive but "wry, sarcastic, [and] witty" romantic. Intellectually, Danny is portrayed as attentive and possessing a strong work ethic.

Smith auditioned for the role of Will McKenzie in the comedy series The Inbetweeners, with the part eventually being given to actor Simon Bird. This was revealed in an interview in 2009 by the show's writer Iain Morris, who said, "We auditioned literally 1,000 people... he was brilliant—down to the last two for Will, I think. I think he was a bit too dashing!"

Doctor Who

Smith was revealed as the Eleventh Doctor in the British science-fiction television series Doctor Who in January 2009 to replace David Tennant, who announced his departure in October 2008. Smith was a relatively unknown actor compared to the actors then speculated about possibly taking on the role, who included Paterson Joseph, David Morrissey, Sean Pertwee, James Nesbitt, Russell Tovey, Catherine Zeta-Jones, Chiwetel Ejiofor, Robert Carlyle, and Billie Piper. Smith was first named as a possible successor less than a day before he was announced as the Eleventh Doctor, on edition of 3 January 2009 of BBC Breakfast, among the names speculated about. His obscurity prompted the news headline "Doctor Who?", a riff on the show's title.

Smith was one of the earliest actors to audition for the role, performing on the first day. The production team, consisting of incoming producer Steven Moffat and BBC Wales Head of Drama and executive producer Piers Wenger, immediately singled him out based on his performance. Smith additionally auditioned for the role of John Watson in the Moffat-created Sherlock, undergoing auditions at the same time; he was unsuccessful, as Moffat believed his eccentric acting style was closer to Holmes, a role that had already been given to Benedict Cumberbatch. At 26 years old, Smith was three years younger than Peter Davison was at the time of his casting as the Doctor in 1981, making him the youngest Doctor and the youngest actor to be suggested for the role. After three weeks of auditions, Moffat and Wenger agreed that it had "always been Matt" and approached him to accept the role.

Smith made his debut as the Doctor in the episode "The Eleventh Hour" in April 2010. The BBC were cautious about casting Smith because they felt that a 26-year-old could not play the Doctor adequately; Wenger shared the same sentiment but thought Smith had proven his acting quality in Party Animals, which Wenger thought highlighted Smith's "mercurial qualities". Some fans of the show believed that Smith was inexperienced and too young for the role, while others supported him by citing his demonstrated acting ability. For his performance in his first series, he was nominated in the Outstanding Drama Performance Category of the National Television Awards. Smith is the first actor in the role to garner a nomination for a British Academy Television Award for Best Actor.

Smith said of his character, "The Doctor is excited and fascinated by the tiniest of things. By everything. By every single thing. That's what's wonderful about him as a character. It's why children like him, I think. Because he doesn't dismiss anything. He's not cynical. He's open to every single facet of the universe." In June 2010, Smith appeared on stage with Orbital, and performed with them a version of the Doctor Who theme, at the Glastonbury Festival. Smith hosted the Doctor Who Prom at the Royal Albert Hall on 24–25 July 2010. On the morning of 26 May 2012, Smith carried the Olympic torch in Cardiff, an activity which was noted by Doctor Who fans for its resemblance to a 2006 episode of the show in which the Doctor carried the torch. On 1 June 2013, the BBC announced that Smith would be leaving Doctor Who at the end of the 2013 Christmas special. He was succeeded by Peter Capaldi. Reflecting upon his decision to leave in a 2016 interview, he expressed regret for not staying longer, stating that he wanted to work longer with co-star Jenna Coleman. In 2018, while appearing on Desert Island Discs, he revealed that he nearly turned down the role of the Doctor.

Post-Doctor Who work
In June 2015, Smith was cast as Prince Philip in the Netflix royal drama The Crown. He played the role for the series' first two seasons, garnering a nomination for the Primetime Emmy Award for Outstanding Supporting Actor in a Drama Series in 2018.

In 2021, Smith appeared in the music videos for the songs "We're On Our Way Now" and "Flying on the Ground" by Noel Gallagher's High Flying Birds.

In 2020, he was cast as Daemon Targaryen in the series House of the Dragon, a prequel to the fantasy drama series Game of Thrones. The series premiered on 21 August 2022.

Film
Smith was cast in Martin McDonagh's black comedy crime In Bruges (2008), as the younger version of Ralph Fiennes' character, but his scenes did not appear in the final cut of the film. He starred in the 2009 short film Together and the 2010 film Womb.

In February 2013, it was reported that Smith had been cast in Ryan Gosling's directorial debut Lost River, which was released in 2014.

Smith's directorial debut, the short film Cargese, was aired on Sky Arts in May 2013.

Smith had a supporting role as the embodiment of Skynet in Terminator Genisys (2015). He was set to have more screen time in the sixth and seventh films in the series, but these proposed films were cancelled in the wake of Terminator Genisys' commercial and critical failure.

On 20 November 2014, it was announced that Smith would star in the action-thriller film Patient Zero. It was released in 2018, and received negative reviews.

In January 2019, he joined the Sony's Spider-Man Universe spin-off film Morbius as Milo, a living vampire, although he was initially announced to be portraying the supervillain Loxias Crown / Hunger. The film was released on 1 April 2022. It received negative reviews, although Smith's performance garnered some praise from critics.

In February 2019, it was announced that he had joined the cast of Edgar Wright's Last Night in Soho. The film was released in 2021.

Theatre
During Smith's tenure in On the Shore of the Wide World, the play transferred to the Royal National Theatre in London. After finishing the play, he took on the role of Lockwood, a pupil in the Alan Bennett play The History Boys. After The History Boys, he acted in the teen play Burn/Chatroom/Citizenship and with Christian Slater in Swimming with Sharks, the latter being his West End début.

In 2007, Smith appeared as Henry in the Polly Stenham play That Face at the Royal Court Theatre Upstairs in Chelsea. The play transferred to the Duke of York's Theatre in the West End in 2008 and became Smith's second role there. That Face focuses primarily upon alcohol and drug addiction in an upper-middle-class family after the paternal figure in the family leaves. As Henry, Smith portrayed an aspiring artist who left school to take care of his mother. To prepare for the role, the cast interviewed alcoholics and their families. Smith discussed his character's relationship with his mother in a May 2008 interview with the Evening Standard.

The entire cast of the play was nominated for the 2008 Laurence Olivier Award for Outstanding Achievement in an Affiliate Theatre, and Smith garnered an Evening Standard Theatre Award nomination for Best Newcomer for his role. Upon its transfer to the West End, Smith's performance as Henry was highlighted as one of the positive aspects of the play by critics for the Evening Standard, Daily Express, The Guardian, and The Times.

On 7 October 2013, it was announced Smith would play Patrick Bateman in the musical adaptation of American Psycho at London's Almeida Theatre. The show began its run in December 2013.

Smith reunited with his The Crown co-star Claire Foy in a production of the Duncan Macmillan play Lungs at The Old Vic beginning in October 2019.

Personal life
Smith was in a relationship with Brazilian actress and singer Mayana Moura from 2008 to 2009. He also had an on-off relationship with model Daisy Lowe from 2010 to 2014. From 2014 to 2019, he was in a relationship with actress Lily James.

Smith is an atheist. He is an avid supporter of Blackburn Rovers. He has cited his favourite band Radiohead as an inspiration, and referred to Oasis as "the greatest rock-and-roll band in the world". In 2015, he was named one of GQs 50 Best-Dressed British Men.

Filmography

Film

Television

Stage

Video games

Short film

Audio

Awards and nominations

References

Further reading

External links

1982 births
Living people
21st-century atheists
21st-century English male actors
Actors from Northamptonshire
Alumni of the University of East Anglia
Articles containing video clips
English atheists
English male film actors
English male stage actors
English male television actors
English male video game actors
National Youth Theatre members
People educated at Northampton School for Boys
People from Northampton